The Bidvest Group Limited also known as Bidvest Group or  Bidvest is a South African services, trading, and distribution company.

History
Bidvest was founded in 1988 by Brian Joffe and listed on the Johannesburg Stock Exchange in 1990. The Bidvest Group Limited has a corporate office in Johannesburg, South Africa, and employs approximately 132,870 people.

The Bidvest Group Limited board comprises eleven members. In March 2019 Bidvest named current Executive Director Mpumi Madisa as CEO-designate. After the retirement of Lindsay Ralphs on 30 September 2020, Mpumi Madisa assumed the role of Bidvest CEO.

See also
Bidvest Insurance
Bidvest Bank
Steinhoff International
Woolworths Holdings Limited

References

Companies based in Johannesburg
Bidvest companies
Companies listed on the Johannesburg Stock Exchange
South African companies established in 1988